F31 or F.31 may refer to:

Vehicles 
Aircraft
 Farman F.31, a French prototype fighter aircraft

Automobiles
 BMW 3 Series (F31), a German estate car
 Nissan Leopard F31, a Japanese sedan

Ships and boats
 F-31 Sport Cruiser a trimaran sailboat
 , a submarine depot ship of the Royal Navy
 , a Tribal-class destroyer of the Royal Navy
 , two frigates of the Indian Navy

Other uses 
 F31 (classification), a disability sport classification for seated throwing events
 Bipolar affective disorder
 Fluorine-31 (31F), an isotope of fluorine